St. Paraskevi Church in Kwiatoń - a Gothic, wooden church located in the village of Kwiatoń from the nineteenth-century, which together with different tserkvas is designated as part of the UNESCO Wooden tserkvas of the Carpathian region in Poland and Ukraine.

History

The tserkva was built in the second half of the seventeenth-century. The date of the completion of the tserkva was dated at 1700. The tower was built in 1743. The date for the completion of the tserkva was found on one of its wooden framework columns. However, this date could relate to the renovation of the old tower. The tserkva's tower is considered to be the oldest tower built in the Lemko church architectural style. After Operation Vistula, the tserkva was transformed into a Roman Catholic church, belonging to the Uście Gorlickie parish.

References

World Heritage Sites in Poland
Gorlice County
Kwiatoń
Wooden churches in Poland